Margaret Simpson (born 1981) is a Ghanaian heptathlete.

Margaret Simpson may also refer to:

Margaret E. B. Simpson (1906-1994), Scottish archaeologist
Maggie Simpson, a fictional character in the animated television series The Simpsons